Claude Robbins "Chena" Gilstrap (July 31, 1914 – August 9, 2002) was an American football coach.  He was the ninth head football coach
at Arlington State College—now known as the University of Texas at Arlington—serving for 13 seasons, from 1953 to 1965, compiling a record of 85–40–3. This ranks him first at UT Arlington in total wins and second at UT Arlington in winning percentage.   The school discontinued its football team after completion of the 1985 season.

Gilstrap is only former UTA coach or player inducted into the Texas Sports Hall of Fame.  He was athletic director and head
football coach from 1952 to 1965 and remained as athletic director until 1975. His teams won consecutive Junior Rose Bowl
games in Pasadena beginning in 1956. The ’57 Arlington State College squad was undefeated and ranked No. 1 nationally among junior colleges. Gilstrap guided UTA from junior college status to a four-year program in 1959.  He died in 2002; he had been suffering from Alzheimer's and Parkinson's disease.

References

External links
 

1914 births
2002 deaths
Schreiner Mountaineers football coaches
UT Arlington Mavericks athletic directors
Texas–Arlington Mavericks football coaches
People from Granger, Texas
Coaches of American football from Texas